Miguel Ángel Soria López (born 26 March 1974) is a Spanish former professional footballer who played as a centre-back.

Career
Soria joined Levante UD on loan from Valencia CF for the 1996–97 season.

References

External links
 

Living people
1974 births
Spanish footballers
Association football central defenders
La Liga players
Segunda División players
Segunda División B players
Valencia CF Mestalla footballers
Valencia CF players
Levante UD footballers
CD Numancia players
Córdoba CF players
UD Almería players